Cayetano Pignatelli, 3rd Marquis of Rubí, 9th Baron of Llinars (12 October 1730 - ?) was a Spanish nobleman and military figure who played a very important role in determining Spanish policy towards Texas and Mexico. He abandoned the East Texas colonies in the 18th century.

Early life
Rubí was born in Barcelona. He was the son of Francisco Pignatelli y de Aymerich, a lieutenant general of the Kingdom of Aragon and ambassador to France and María Francisca Rubí Corbera y Saint Climent, 2nd Marchioness of Rubí and Baronessa of Llinas. The marquis of Rubí was the nephew of the 6th Prince of Belmonte, Don (Giuseppe) Antonio Pignatelli y Aymerich, and of Doña Marianna, Countess of Althann, lady in waiting to Empress Elizabeth, consort of Emperor Charles VI and mother of Empress Maria Theresa of Austria.

Career
Rubí, who had achieved the high rank of field marshal and knight commander in the Order of Alcántara, arrived at Veracruz on 1 November 1764, as part of the expedition of Juan de Villalba, who had been sent to New Spain to organize regular army and colonial militia units. On August 7, 1765, King Charles III appointed Rubí inspector of frontier presidios and commissioned him to remedy economic abuses and other urgent matters. When notified of his commission, Rubí went to Mexico City in mid-December 1765 and remained in the capital until March 1766, when he received his instructions from Viceroy Cruillas.

Inspection tour
In the latter half of the eighteenth century, frontier conditions in northern New Spain had deteriorated to such an extent, partly as a result of Indian depredations and management of presidios, that the Spanish crown found it necessary to order an examination of the entire frontier with the view of relocating presidios and making whatever other adjustments might be necessary to prevent further abandonment of the frontier settlements. The Marques de Rubí was given the assignment of investigating this problem. He began his investigation in 1766. Royal engineers Nicolas de La Fora and Joseph de Urrutia assisted Rubi by drawing plans of presidios and drafting maps of the area traversed.

On March 12, Rubí set out on his inspection, traveling first to Querétaro and then to Zacatecas. On April 14 he was joined at Durango by Nicolás de Lafora, his engineer and mapmaker, who kept a diary of the tour, as did Rubí himself. Rubí began his inspection tour in New Mexico, moved to Sonora, and then traveled eastward to Coahuila. He crossed the Rio Grande in July 1767 and proceeded to San Luis de las Amarillas Presidio (San Sabá) by way of the upper Nueces River, where he visited the largely-failed missions at El Cañón. He left San Sabá on August 4 and reached San Antonio de Béxar on August 24, 1767. From San Antonio, Rubí traveled to Los Adaes and began his inspection there on September 14. Subsequently, he also inspected the presidios at El Orcoquisac and La Bahía before leaving Texas at Laredo in November 1767. In all, Rubí's inspection of the northern frontier from the Gulf of California to Louisiana occupied him for twenty-three months, during which he traveled an estimated 7,600 miles.

Rubí's inspection revealed a desperate state of affairs among the settlements in northern New Spain. Munitions and manpower were in very short supply, problematic for a region under the constant threat of Apache Raids. He arrived in Santa Fe to find the settlers dependent on bows and arrow for defense, and the garrison at Los Adaes was not much better off, having just two muskets for 61 men. At the San Sabá mission, conditions had deteriorated so much that Rubí ordered the abandonment  of the settlement, declaring it indefensible.

As a result of his inspection, Rubí recommended that Spain reorganize its frontier defenses along a cordon of fifteen presidios, each about 100 miles apart, that would stretch from the Gulf of California to the mouth of the Guadalupe River in Texas. Above this "real" frontier, which closely approximated the present international boundary between the United States and Mexico, Rubí advised for only San Antonio and Santa Fe to be maintained, and he urged the complete abandonment of East Texas. Finally, Rubí recommended a war of extermination against the Lipan Apaches because of their perfidy and duplicity. He was back in Mexico City by February 1768, and he filed his official report on April 10.

New Regulations for Presidios
More than four years passed before a royal order, commonly known as the New Regulations for Presidios, was issued. As a result of the Rubi recommendations, a new line of defense was established, uniform fortification plans were prescribed, and numerous changes were made in regulations governing military personnel. The new line of fortifications was to be composed of some fifteen presidios situated at about 40-league (120-mile) intervals extending from the Gulf of California on the west to the Gulf of Mexico on the east along what is now approximately the northern boundary of Mexico. The order was published on September 10, 1772.

The New Regulations had an enormous impact on Texas. They called for the abandonment of all missions and presidios in Texas except for those at San Antonio and La Bahía, the strengthening of San Antonio by designating it the new capital of Texas, the removal of soldiers and settlers in East Texas, and the implementation of a new Indian policy aimed at establishing good relations with the northern nations at the expense of the Apaches. With respect to East Texas, Rubí's recommendations were enacted in 1773 but were soon vitiated by the return of settlers to the region and the founding of Nacogdoches in 1779.

Later life
After he sailed from Veracruz in July 1768, Rubí's life is largely obscure. He was summoned to court in 1769 to defend his proposals, and he was in Barcelona in April 1772. When Carlos III died in 1788, Rubí may have accepted retirement at the age of about 63.

References

18th-century Spanish nobility
1730 births
1790s deaths
Cayetano 03
Knights of the Order of Alcántara
Spanish explorers
Spanish generals